The CCP4 file format is file generated by the Collaborative Computational Project Number 4 in 1979. The file format for electron density has become industry standard in X-ray crystallography and Cryo-electron microscopy where the result of the technique is a three-dimensional grid of voxels each with a value corresponding to density of electrons (see wave function) The CCP4 format is supported by almost every molecular graphics suite that supports volumetric data. The major packages include:

Visual molecular dynamics
PyMOL
UCSF Chimera
Bsoft
Coot
MOE

See also
MTZ (file format)
MRC (file format)
EZD (file format)
Chemical file format
Protein Data Bank (file format)
Voxel - one way of presenting 3D densities

External links 
 Format technical details

Computational chemistry
Chemical file formats